John Connolly (–1813) was an American Loyalist during the American Revolution.

Connolly was born in Lancaster County, Pennsylvania to an Irish Catholic father who served in the British military and a woman of English descent . He is best known for a plan he concocted with Virginia Governor Lord Dunmore to raise a regiment of loyalists and Indians in Canada called the Loyal Foresters and lead them to Virginia to help Dunmore put down the rebellion.  In the early 1770s Connolly was the leading figure at the Forks of the Ohio in present-day Western Pennsylvania in Virginia's claims to the region surrounding Pittsburgh.  He was even arrested by the Westmoreland County, Pennsylvania Sheriff for inciting pioneers to ally with Virginia and released on the condition that he would return for trial and stop his crusade only to capture Fort Pitt and declare it for Virginia.  Connolly was traveling from Williamsburg, Virginia to Fort Detroit to carry out this plan when he was captured in Hagerstown, Maryland on 20 November 1775.  Connolly was imprisoned for the remainder of the American Revolution.

References

1741 births
1813 deaths
Loyalists in the American Revolution from Pennsylvania
People from Lancaster County, Pennsylvania